Richard Steven Valenzuela (May 13, 1941 – February 3, 1959), known professionally as Ritchie Valens, was an American guitarist, singer and songwriter. A rock and roll pioneer and a forefather of the Chicano rock movement, Valens was killed in a plane crash eight months into his music career.

Valens had several hits, most notably "La Bamba", which he had adapted from a Mexican folk song. Valens transformed the song into one with a rock rhythm and beat, and it became a hit in 1958, making Valens a pioneer of the Spanish-speaking rock and roll movement. He also had an American number-two hit with "Donna".

On February 3, 1959, on what has become known as "The Day the Music Died", Valens died in a plane crash in Iowa, an accident that also claimed the lives of fellow musicians Buddy Holly and J. P. "The Big Bopper" Richardson, as well as pilot Roger Peterson. Valens was 17 at the time of his death. In 2001, Valens was posthumously inducted into the Rock and Roll Hall of Fame.

Early life
Valens was born as Richard Steven Valenzuela in Pacoima, a neighborhood in the San Fernando Valley region of Los Angeles. His parents, José Esteban Valenzuela (1896–1952) and Concepción "Concha" Reyes (1915–1987), were from Mexico. He had two half-brothers Roberto "Bob" Morales (1937–2018) and Mario Ramirez, and two younger sisters, Connie and Irma.

Valenzuela was brought up hearing traditional Mexican mariachi music, as well as flamenco guitar, R&B, and jump blues. Valenzuela expressed an interest in making music of his own by the age of five. He was encouraged by his father to take up guitar and trumpet, and later taught himself the drums. Though Valenzuela was left-handed, he was so eager to learn the guitar that he mastered the traditional right-handed version of the instrument.

Valenzuela was a 15-year-old student at Pacoima Junior High School at the time of the 1957 Pacoima mid-air collision. He was not at school that day because he was attending the funeral of his grandfather. Recurring nightmares of the disaster led to Valens's fear of flying.

By the time Valenzuela was attending Pacoima Junior High School (now Pacoima Middle School), he would bring his guitar to school and sing and play songs to his friends on the bleachers.

When he was 16 years old, he was invited to join a local band, The Silhouettes (not to be confused with the group of the same name famous for its hit song "Get a Job"). He began as a guitarist, and when the main vocalist left the group, Valenzuela assumed the position. On October 19, 1957, he made his performing debut with The Silhouettes.

Valenzuela also attended San Fernando High School.

Career
A self-taught musician, Valenzuela was an accomplished singer and guitarist. At his appearances, he often improvised new lyrics and added new riffs to popular songs while he was playing.

Bob Keane, the owner and president of small record label Del-Fi Records in Hollywood, was given a tip in May 1958 by San Fernando High School student Doug Macchia about a young performer from Pacoima by the name of Richard Valenzuela. Kids knew the performer as "the Little Richard of San Fernando". Swayed by the Little Richard comparison, Keane went to see Valenzuela play a Saturday-morning matinée at a movie theater in San Fernando. Impressed by the performance, he invited the youth to audition at his home in the Silver Lake area of Los Angeles, where he had a small recording studio in his basement. His recording equipment comprised an early stereo recorder (a two-track Ampex 601-2 portable) and a pair of Neumann U-47 condenser microphones.

After this first audition, Keane signed Valenzuela to Del-Fi on May 27, 1958. At this point, the musician took the name "Ritchie" because, as Keane said, "There were a bunch of 'Richards' around at that time, and I wanted it to be different." Similarly, Keane recommended shortening his surname to "Valens" from Valenzuela to widen his appeal beyond any obvious ethnic group. Valens was ready to enter the studio with a full band backing him. The musicians included René Hall, Carol Kaye, and Earl Palmer. The first songs recorded at Gold Star Studios, at a single studio session one afternoon in July 1958, were "Come On, Let's Go", an original, credited to Valens/Kuhn (Keane's real name), and "Framed", a Leiber and Stoller tune. Pressed and released within days of the recording session, the record was a success. Valens's next record, a double A-side, the final record to be released in his lifetime, had the song "Donna" (written about a real girlfriend Donna Ludwig) coupled with "La Bamba". It sold over one million copies, and was awarded a gold disc by the Recording Industry Association of America.

By the autumn of 1958, the demands of Valens's career forced him to drop out of high school. Keane booked appearances at venues across the United States and performances on television programs.

Personal life 

Valens was in a relationship with Donna Ludwig, his high school sweetheart, from 1957 until his death. Ludwig's parents disapproved of her dating a Hispanic man. Valens's song "Donna" was written for her. Their relationship became strained due to Valens's increasing popularity and touring. After his death, Ludwig attended his funeral. In 1987, she attended the premiere of La Bamba, a biopic featuring the life and career of Valens.

Death 

After the February 2, 1959, performance in Clear Lake, Iowa (which ended around midnight), Holly, Richardson, and Valens flew out of the Mason City airport in a small plane that Holly had chartered. Valens was on the plane because he won a coin toss with Holly's backup guitarist Tommy Allsup. Holly's bassist, Waylon Jennings, voluntarily gave up his seat on the plane to J.P. Richardson, who was ill with the flu. Around 12:55 am on February 3, 1959, the four-passenger Beechcraft Bonanza, (N3794N), departed for Fargo, North Dakota, and crashed a few minutes after takeoff for reasons still unknown. The crash killed all three passengers and pilot Roger Peterson instantly upon impact. As with Holly and Richardson, Valens suffered massive and unsurvivable head injuries along with blunt-force trauma to the chest. At just 17 years old, Valens was the youngest to die in the crash.

The tragedy inspired singer Don McLean to write his 1971 hit "American Pie", immortalizing February 3 as "The Day the Music Died". Valens's remains were buried at San Fernando Mission Cemetery in Mission Hills, Los Angeles, California.

Legacy

Valens was a pioneer of Chicano rock and Latin rock, and inspired many musicians of Mexican heritage. He influenced the likes of Los Lobos, Los Lonely Boys, and Carlos Santana, as he had become nationally successful at a time when very few Latinos were in American rock and pop music. He is considered the first Latino to successfully cross over into mainstream rock.

"La Bamba" proved to be his most influential recording, not only by becoming a pop chart hit sung entirely in Spanish, but also because of its successful blending of traditional Latin American music with rock. Valens was the first to capitalize on this formula, which was later adopted by such varied artists as Selena, Caifanes, Café Tacuba, Circo, El Gran Silencio, Aterciopelados, Gustavo Santaolalla, and many others in the Latin alternative scene. Ironically, the Valenzuela family spoke only English at home, and he knew very little Spanish. Valens learned the lyrics phonetically to record "La Bamba" in Spanish. In 2019, the Valens version of "La Bamba" was selected by the U.S. Library of Congress for preservation in the National Recording Registry as "culturally, historically, and aesthetically significant".

"Come On, Let's Go" has been recorded by Los Lobos, the Ramones and the Paley Brothers (the Ramones on guitar, bass, and drums and the Paley Brothers on vocals), Tommy Steele, the Huntingtons, Girl in a Coma, and the McCoys. Johnny Rebb and his Rebels recorded the song for Leedon/Canetoad Records in Australia. "Donna" has been recorded by artists as diverse as MxPx, Marty Wilde, the Youngbloods, Clem Snide, Cappadonna, and Misfits.

Robert Quine has cited Valens's guitar playing as an early influence on his style. Valens also inspired Jimi Hendrix, Chan Romero, Carlos Santana, Chris Montez, and Keith O'Conner Murphy, among others.

Valens's mother, Concha, who died in 1987, is buried alongside him.

Representation in other media

 Valens has been the subject of several biopic films, including the 1987 film La Bamba. Primarily set in 1957–1959, it depicted Valens from age 16 to 17. It introduced Lou Diamond Phillips as Valens. Los Lobos performed most of the music in the film. 
 Valens was portrayed by Gilbert Melgar in the final scene of The Buddy Holly Story. 
Lil' Libros has an upcoming book based on Valens' life. (2019)

Tributes 

In 1989, Ken Paquette, a Wisconsin fan of the 1950s era, erected a stainless-steel monument depicting a guitar and a set of three records bearing the names of each of the three performers killed in the accident. He also created a similar stainless-steel monument to the three musicians that was installed near the Riverside Ballroom in Green Bay, Wisconsin. That memorial was unveiled on July 17, 2003.

Paxton Park in Pacoima was renamed in memory of Valens in the 1990s. A city council member representing Pacoima proposed the renaming to honor Valens so residents would "remember his humble background and emulate his accomplishments."

Musician Tommy Allsup started a club, "Tommy's Heads Up Saloon", in Dallas in 1979. The club was named for the fateful coin toss between Valens and him twenty years prior.

"Boogie with Stu" from Led Zeppelin's Physical Graffiti album was inspired by Valens' song "Ooh, My Head". It did not credit Valens or Bob Keane, instead crediting Valens' mother. Eventually, a lawsuit was filed by Keane, and half of the award went to Valens' mother, although she was not part of the suit.

On May 11, 1990, a star bearing his name was unveiled on the Hollywood Walk of Fame. The star cost $3,500, which was paid for with money raised in his name by family and friends. His star permanently resides at 6733 Hollywood Boulevard in front of Artisan's Patio mini mall.

On February 2, 2009, Surf Ballroom held a 50th anniversary honoring the last concert of Buddy Holly, J.P. "The Big Bopper" Richardson, and Valens. The event lasted one week and had performances that honored the memories of the three men. Family members and friends of the stars made appearances. Their legacies live on through events such as these.

Many murals have been painted around Pacoima in honor of the late Valens.
In 1985, artist Manuel Velasquez (assisted by 25 students) created a 12- by 20-ft (3.6- by 6.1 meters) mural, which was painted on the side of a classroom building at the former Pacoima Junior High (now Pacoima Middle School) depicting Valens's image, records labeled with some of his greatest hits, and the newspaper article about the plane crash that took his life.
Another mural went up in 2012 at the intersection of Van Nuys Boulevard and Amboy Avenue, which was painted by Hector Ponce. A second one was painted in 2012 by Levi Ponce and is located on Van Nuys Boulevard and Telfair Avenue. A monument has also been built as a tribute. It was put on display in 2013, and is located at Ritchie Valens Park at 10731 Laurel Canyon Boulevard.

A section of the Interstate 5 Freeway in the northeast San Fernando Valley has been named after Valens. The Ritchie Valens Memorial Highway is located between the 170 and 118 freeways. On August 25, 2018, a celebration was held in his honor to commemorate his legacy. The unveiling ceremony was held at Ritchie Valens Park, located at 10731 Laurel Canyon Boulevard in Pacoima. Replicas of the freeway sign were revealed at the celebration. The event was open to the public and free to attend. A few relatives of Valens played live performances as a tribute to the late singer. Leaders from the community and state gathered for the festivities.

In May 2022, the United States Post Office in Pacoima, California named the post office in honor of Ritchie Valens.

Discography

Studio albums

Live albums

Main compilation albums

 Note: There are numerous Valens compilation albums.

Singles

Filmography and TV appearances
 Go, Johnny, Go! (1959), was his only film appearance. He plays in a scene, after being introduced by Chuck Berry, singing "Ooh My Head". Valens died shortly after filming it.
American Bandstand (6th October 1958), TV show hosted by Dick Clark.

See also

 La Bamba (film)

References

External links

 
 Official Ritchie Valens webpage
 
 RAB Hall of Fame: Ritchie Valens 
 Profile, history-of-rock.com
 Profile, tsimon.com
 Tribute: The Day the Music Died, angelfire.com

 
1941 births
1959 deaths
Accidental deaths in Iowa
American child singers
American male guitarists
American male singer-songwriters
American musicians of Mexican descent
American rock guitarists
American rock musicians
American rock singers
American rock songwriters
American singer-songwriters
Burials at San Fernando Mission Cemetery
Chicano rock musicians
Del-Fi Records artists
Hispanic and Latino American musicians
Musicians killed in aviation accidents or incidents
People from Pacoima, Los Angeles
Rock and roll musicians
Rock en Español musicians
San Fernando High School alumni
Victims of aviation accidents or incidents in the United States
Victims of aviation accidents or incidents in 1959
20th-century American guitarists
20th-century American singers
20th-century American male singers